The plastograph, or Brabender plastograph, is a device for the continuous observation of torque in the shearing of a polymer with a range of temperatures and shear rates.  The generic device records lubricity, plasticity, scorch, cure, shear and heat stability.

Perhaps the most popular use of the plastograph is its use in baking where it is known as a Farinograph.

It was designed by Carl Wilhelm Brabender and produced by Brabender Industries, founded in 1923.

External links
 Official website

Polymers